David Fogg (born 28 May 1951) is an English former footballer who played for Oxford United and Wrexham. During his spell at Oxford, he played 293 league games. After retirement, Fogg joined the coaching staff at Oxford, before going on to be youth team coach at Everton and Cardiff City.

References

External links
Rage Online profile

1951 births
English footballers
Association football defenders
Wrexham A.F.C. players
Oxford United F.C. players
English Football League players
Living people